Audrius Žuta (born 5 January 1969) is a Lithuanian former football player and referee.

Career
He obtained a total number of 26 caps for the Lithuania national football team, scoring two goals. After retirement from playing he worked as football referee from 2002 until 2007.

References
 
 
 
 
 
 
 

1969 births
Living people
Soviet footballers
Lithuanian footballers
Lithuania international footballers
Expatriate footballers in Belarus
Expatriate footballers in Latvia
Lithuanian expatriate sportspeople in Latvia
FK Atlantas players
FK Sirijus Klaipėda players
FC Dinamo Minsk players
FK Kareda Kaunas players
FK Ventspils players
FBK Kaunas footballers
FK Žalgiris players
Lithuanian football referees
Association football midfielders
Lithuanian expatriate sportspeople in Belarus